The Khufu ship is an intact full-size solar barque from ancient Egypt. It was sealed into a pit at the foot of the Great Pyramid of pharaoh Khufu around 2500 BC, during the Fourth Dynasty of the ancient Egyptian Old Kingdom. Like other buried Ancient Egyptian ships, it was apparently part of the extensive grave goods intended for use in the afterlife. The Khufu ship is one of the oldest, largest and best-preserved vessels from antiquity.

The ship was preserved in the Giza Solar boat museum, but was relocated to the Grand Egyptian Museum in August 2021.

History

Function
The history and function of the ship is not precisely known. It is of the type known as a "solar barge", a ritual vessel believed by ancient Egyptians to carry the resurrected king across the heavens with the sun god Ra. However, it bears some signs of having been used in water, and it is possible that the ship was either a funerary "barge" used to carry the king's embalmed body from Memphis to Giza, or even that Khufu himself used it as a "pilgrimage ship" to visit holy places and that it was then buried for him to use in the afterlife. It contained no bodies, unlike northern European ship burials.

Discovery and description 

The ship was one of two rediscovered in 1954 by Kamal el-Mallakh—undisturbed since it was sealed into a pit carved out of the Giza bedrock. It was built largely of Lebanon cedar planking in the "shell-first" construction technique, using unpegged tenons of Christ's thorn. The ship was built with a flat bottom composed of several planks, but no actual keel, with the planks and frames lashed together with Halfah grass, and has been reconstructed from 1,224 pieces which had been laid in a logical, disassembled order in the pit beside the pyramid. 

It was thus identified as the world's oldest intact ship and has been described as "a masterpiece of woodcraft" that could sail today if put into a lake, or a river. However, the vessel may not have been designed for sailing, as there is no rigging, or for rowing, as there is no room. Its discovery was described as one of the greatest Ancient Egyptian discoveries in Zahi Hawass's documentary Egypt's Ten Greatest Discoveries.

Reconstruction
It took years for the boat to be reassembled, primarily by the Egyptian Department of Antiquities' chief restorer, Ahmed Youssef Moustafa. Before reconstructing the boat, Moustafa had to gain enough experience on Ancient Egyptian boat-building. He studied the reliefs carved on walls and tombs as well as many of the small wooden models of ships and boats found in tombs. Moustafa visited the Nile boatyards of Old Cairo and Maadi and went to Alexandria, where wooden river boats were still being made. He hoped that modern Egyptian shipwrights had retained ship-building methods that would suggest how Ancient Egyptians built their ships. Then he investigated the work of shipwrights who built in a different tradition.

Exhibition 
The Khufu ship was put on public display in a specially built museum at the Giza pyramid complex in 1982; the museum was a small modern facility resting alongside the Great Pyramid. The first floor of the museum took the visitor through visuals, photographs and writings on the process of excavating and restoring the boat. The ditch where the main boat was found was incorporated into the museum ground floor design. To see the restored boat, the visitor ascended a staircase leading to the second floor. Floor to ceiling windows allowed for much sunlight and the wooden walkway took the visitor around the boat where the visitor could get a closer view of its impressive size.

In August 2021, the ship was relocated to the Grand Egyptian Museum.

Gallery

See also
 Atet
 Abydos boats
 Ancient Egyptian technology
Dahshur boats
 Ships preserved in museums

References

Further reading
 Nancy Jenkins (1980). The boat beneath the pyramid: King Cheops' royal ship  
 Paul Lipke (1984). The royal ship of Cheops: a retrospective account of the discovery, restoration and reconstruction. Based on interviews with Hag Ahmed Youssef Moustafa. Oxford: B.A.R.,   
 Björn Landström (1970). Ships of the Pharaohs: 4000 Years of Egyptian Shipbuilding. Doubleday & Company, Inc., 
 Weitzman, David (2020 [2009]). Pharaoh's Boat Reissued by Purple House Press,

External links

 The Smell of Time
 The Solar Barque, Nova Online
 Web archive backup: Ships of the World: An Historical Encyclopedia – "Cheops ship"
 The Giza Mapping Project
 A Visitors Perspective of the Khufu Boat Museum
 Khufu ship free high resolution images

Great Pyramid of Giza
Ancient Egyptian ships
Ships preserved in museums
Ship burials
Khufu
Ancient ships
1954 archaeological discoveries